George Moorse (May 1, 1936, Bellmore, New York – July 30, 1999, Cologne) was an American film director who worked and lived in Germany.

Moorse was educated at Hofstra College and at Washington Square College in New York. He began his work in Germany as a screenwriter, including writing for Peter Lilienthal (Claire). He was considered one of the leading directors of the Junge Deutsche film movement and worked on the television series Anderland. He won the Bundesfilmpreise for his short film In Side Out (1965) and the feature film  (1971). In 1971, he also shot the horror TV film Vampira.

Moorse filmed Peter Zadek's works for television and achieved particular popularity as a director of 186 episodes of the cult series Lindenstraße, for which he worked on until his death. He also directed the 1995 film Entführung aus der Lindenstraße.

Moorse died in 1999 of a heart attack.

In memory of Moorse, the ice cream parlor in the series Lindenstraße was first named "Café Moorse" and, since mid-2009, "Café George".

Filmography (selection)
 1967:  (TV film)
 1967: 
 1968:  (TV film)
 1968: Liebe und so weiter
 1971: 
 1971: Vampira (TV film)
 1973: Pan
 1973: Inki
 1974: Schattenreiter
 1980: Daniel
 1983: Brandmale
 1995: Entführung aus der Lindenstraße (TV film)

Further reading
 Munzinger-Archiv: Internationales Biographisches Archiv. 44/1999 from October 25, 1999

References

External links 
 
 German Filmhouse: George Moorse

1936 births
1999 deaths
Film directors from New York City
American expatriates in Germany
Hofstra University alumni